The HP Pavilion dv7 was a model series of laptops manufactured by Hewlett-Packard from 2008 that featured a 17.3" diagonal display. The HP Pavilion dv4 featured a 14.1" and the HP Pavilion dv5 a 15.4" display. The DV7 had bays for two hard drives, but was supplied with one; if a second hard drive was fitted then a hard drive hardware kit of bracket, connector cable, Mylar shield, and screws was required.

As of August 2012, most Pavilion laptops (namely the Pavilion M4, M6, dv6 and dv7 series) have been upgraded, rebranded and integrated into the premium HP Envy lineup with the newer Microsoft Windows 8 operating system. The Pavilion dv7 as such is therefore out of production.

Models

dv7t - Uses An Intel Processor
dv7z - Uses An AMD Processor

dv7-1000 to dv7-1400 series 
Model produced alongside dv5 series. Display 17.0" CCFL WXGA+ (1440 × 900) or WSXGA+ (1680 × 1050).

dv7-1000 to dv7-2300 series 
Model produced alongside dv6 series. Display 17.3" LED HD+ (1600 × 900), BrightView or flush glass AntiGlare. New look. MediaPlay button has been removed from the capacitive board.

dv7-3000 to dv7-3300 series 
Very similar to the dv7-2000. In addition, was introduced a models with an Intel i5 and i7 processors and Nvidia discrete graphics — GeForce G 105M (512 MB) or GeForce GT 230M (1024 MB).

dv7-4000 to dv7-4300 series 
Model produced alongside dv6-3000 series. Completely changed the design and construction, reducing the amount of gadget link in used in previous models. This will remove an ExpressCard slot, remote control, capacitive board, built-in TV tuner. Introduced island keyboard and "ClickPad" touchpad without buttons. New motherboard and cooling system reduced the amount of available ports on the left side of the computer. Introduced switchable graphics.

dv7-5000 series 
Intel-based notebooks:
Processors: II-generation Intel Core i7 Quad
Graphics: Intel HD Graphics (UMA), switchable ATI Mobility Radeon HD 5650 1024 MB or ATI Mobility Radeon HD 5470 512 MB

dv7-6000 to dv7-6100 series 
Display 17.3" LED HD+ (1600x900) BrightView or FullHD (1920×1080) AntiGlare. New look. Touchpad with mechanical switch. Quad speakers and subwoofer. eSATA combo port was removed.

dv7-6b00

dv7-6c00

dv7-7000 and dv7-7100 series 
Some design changes. Quad speakers (two in the lid) and subwoofer. Supports III-generation Intel Core processors and mSATA SSD drive. Now supports two USB 3.0 ports. Second headphone jack was removed.

ENVY dv7-7200 and dv7-7300 

The Pavilion brand was renamed to the brand ENVY. Laptops are sold with Microsoft Windows 8 operating system. For this reason, changed the motherboard. Added some new CPUs. Other specifications are the same as the DV7-7000 series notebooks.

In 2015. HP released a new series of HP Envy Laptops including  the dv3, dv5 and dv7 models. The models feature a fingerprint sensor, a lifted hinge, Bang and Olufsen speakers and new Intel Core i processors based on the Skylake architecture. HP claims that this laptop is a very thin laptop due to the fact that the laptop was meant for entertainment.

References

Pavilion dv7